Fame Looks at Music '83 was a special concert episode for the third season of the hit TV series Fame. The concert took place on December 27, 1983, at the Santa Monica Civic Auditorium in Santa Monica, California before a live capacity audience. The broadcast was aired on January 28, 1984. This special features the cast of Fame, billed as "The Kids from Fame," along with the season three regular dancers. The concert is the second of the season, their first concert in the U.S., and their third overall. The concert featured performances of popular music by the cast taking a look back at popular music in the year 1983 (See 1983 in music). Guest starring was Irene Cara, who sang "Fame" — the song an Academy Award winner — originally for the film of the same title in which she also starred as the original Coco.

Set list
"1999" – Performed by the Band (Originally by Prince)
"Sweet Dreams (Are Made of This)" – Performed by Debbie Allen (Originally by The Eurythmics)
"Electric Avenue" – Performed by Gene Anthony Ray (Originally by Eddy Grant)
"Gloria" – Performed by Valarie Landsburg (Originally by Laura Branigan)
"Little Red Corvette" – Performed by Cynthia Gibb and Carlo Imperato (Originally by Prince)
"Puttin' on the Ritz" – Performed by Billy Hufsey (Originally by Taco)
"All Night Long (All Night)" – Performed by the Band (Originally by Lionel Richie)
"Total Eclipse of the Heart" – Performed by Valarie Landsburg (Originally by Bonnie Tyler)
"Love Is a Battlefield" – Performed by Valarie Landsburg (Originally by Pat Benatar)
"Tell Her About It" – Performed by Carlo Imperato (Originally by Billy Joel)
"Why Me?" – Performed by Irene Cara
"Maniac" – Performed by Billy Hufsey (by Michael Sembello)
"Take Me to Heart" – Performed by Cynthia Gibb (Originally by Quarterflash)
"Heart Attack" – Performed by Cynthia Gibb (Originally by Olivia Newton-John)
Tribute to Michael Jackson (with the "Fame" dancers):
"Beat It" – Performed by Debbie Allen
"Baby Be Mine" – Performed by Debbie Allen
"Billie Jean" – Performed by Debbie Allen
---End---
"Cold Blooded" – Performed by Gene Anthony Ray (Originally by Rick James)
"We've Got Tonight" – Performed by Cynthia Gibb and Billy Hufsey (Originally by Kenny Rogers and Sheena Easton)
"You Are" – Performed by Debbie Allen and Gene Anthony Ray (Originally by Lionel Richie)
"Never Gonna Let You Go" – Performed by Carlo Imperato, Valarie Landsburg and Cast (Originally by Sérgio Mendes)	
"Flashdance... What a Feeling" – Performed by Irene Cara
"Up Where We Belong" – Performed by the Band (Originally by Joe Cocker and Jennifer Warnes)
"Far from Over" – Performed by the Band (Originally by Frank Stallone)
"Fame" (Reprise) – Performed by Irene Cara and Cast

Credits
 Producer: Ken Ehrlich
 Directed by: Walter C. Miller
 Written by: Ken Ehrlich
 Concert Staged and Choreographed by: Debbie Allen
 Associate Producer: Greg Sills
 Music Arranged, Conducted, and Produced by: Gary Scott
 Art Director: Ira Diamond
 Costumes Designed by: Warden Neil
 Lighting Designed by: Bob Dickinson
 Producer's Coordinator: Frank Fischer
 Set Dressing by: Leonard Mazzola
 Music Production Assistant: Lori Leiberman
 Assistant Choreographer: Otis Sallid
 Fame Dancers: Derrick Brice, Michael DeLorenzo, Darryl DeWald, Cameron English, Leanne Gerrish, Kimberlee Layton, Joni Palmer, Marguerite Pomerhn, Eartha D. Robinson, Serge Rodnunsky, Allysia Sneed, Bronwyn Thomas, Darryl Tribble, Rocker Verastique, and Margaret Williams.
and 
 The Waters: Julia, Luther, Maxine, and Oren.
 Production Associate: Terry McCoy
 Production Assistant: Tracy Long
 Production Associate: Debbie Milder
 Stage Managers: John Marsh, Vince Roxon, and Richard Schor
 Technical Director: Gene Crowe
 Audio: Don Worsham
 Video: Keith Winikoff
 Camera: Sam Dowlen, Tom Heren, Dean Hall, Dave Livisohn, Bill Philhin, and Hector Ramirez.
 Make Up: Jack Wilson
 Wardrobe Assistant: Phyllis Corcoran-Woods
 Post Production Supervisor: Frank Merwald
 ???: Morpheus
 Creative Consultant: David DeSilva
 Video Tape Facilities: Greene Crowe
 Executive in Charge of Production: Ted Zachar

References

See also
List of Fame (1982 TV series) episodes

1984 American television episodes
Television shows directed by Walter C. Miller
Fame (franchise)